Carlo Salis (1680–1763) was an Italian painter of the Baroque period. Born in Verona. He was initially a pupil of the painter Alessandro Marchesini, then went to work under Giovanni Gioseffo dal Sole and later with Antonio Balestra in Venice.

References

1680 births
1763 deaths
17th-century Italian painters
Italian male painters
18th-century Italian painters
Painters from Verona
Italian Baroque painters
18th-century Italian people
18th-century Italian male artists